Sankarea: Undying Love is a 2012 anime television series produced by Studio Deen. The series has been based on the manga series by Mitsuru Hattori. The story follows a boy named Chihiro Furuya and his relationship with Rea Sanka, a girl who dies and comes back to life as a zombie due to a resurrection potion Chihiro had made. The 12-episode television series aired in Japan between April 5 and June 28, 2012. Three additional original video animation episodes were released. Episodes 00 and 14 were bundled with the limited editions of the 6th and 7th volumes of the manga respectively, which were published on June 8 and November 9, 2012. Episode 13 was released with the anime series' 6th Blu-ray Disc and DVD volumes on November 30, 2012.

The series has been licensed in North America by Funimation, released the series dubbed in English on Blu-ray Disc and DVD on October 1, 2013. MVM Films has licensed the series in the United Kingdom.

Episode list

OVAs

References

Sankarea: Undying Love